DJ Shiru (real name Kiberu Bashir) is an African Disc jockey from Uganda popularly known as 256 spin doctor. He started his career at the age of 17 following his brother, a famous Dj Rota in Kampala, Uganda. Together with DJ Rota, DJ Shiru was one of the first Disc Jockeys to play music for international artists in Uganda. He is a show host of the DanceFloor at one of Uganda's top stations 97.7 Record FM.

He went to become one of the top DJs in Uganda with his debut big event being at the Pearl of Africa Music Awards in 2006. He later went on to host a number of international artists in Uganda as the host DJ to artists like R. Kelly, Sean Kingston, Sean Paul, UB40, Demarco, Konshens, Elephant Man, Beenie Man, Busy Signal, Kevin Lyttle, Akon, Wyclef Jean, Chaka Chaka, Chico Chimola, Davido, Sisqo, P Square, Fuse ODG, Patoranking, Neyo, Kiss Daniel, Alaine, Diamond Platnumz and a number of more local Ugandan house artists. For example, DJ Shiru has produced or collaborated with local musicians like Radio & Weasle, Bebe cool, Chameleon, Irene Ntale, Aidan quin, Sheebah, Peter miles, Cindy, Remah, Eddy Kenzo, Gravity, Aziz Azion, Ray S, Juliana Kanyomozi, Vinka, Jowy Landa among others

DJ Shiru hosts a number of annual events including: The Mega-Shirumatic Experience and East African Deejayz Carnival.

Awards

 Won his first Award as the wickedest deejay of year 2007 Buzz Teens Awards
 Won wickedest deejay of the year 2008 "Buzz Teen Awards"
 Won wickedest deejay of the year 2009 "Buzz Teen Awards"
 Icon deejay Award United Kingdom 2009
 Won best deejay in Uganda 2009/2010 Golden Awards
 Won wickedest deejay of the year 2010 "Buzz Teen Awards"
 Won wickedest deejay of the year 2011 "Buzz Teen Awards"
 Won wickedest deejay of the year 2012 "Buzz Teen Awards"
 Kandanke 2nd Anniversary supporting Deejay Awards 2013
 Won wickedest deejay of the year 2013 "Buzz Teen Awards"
 Won best deejay of the year 2013 "Hipipo Awards"
 Won best deejay of the year 2014 "Hipipo Awards"
 Won best deejay of the year 2015/16 "Hipipo Awards"
 Won wickedest deejay of the year 2014 "Buzz Teen Awards"
 Won wickedest deejay of the year 2015 "Buzz Teen Awards"
 Won best deejay of the year 2015/16 Best of the Best Awards [BBA]
 Won life Time Achievement Award celebrating 10 years of winning 2016 "Buzz Teen Awards"

References 

Year of birth missing (living people)
Living people
Ugandan DJs